Damschroder is a surname. Notable people with the surname include:

David Damschroder (born 1954), American writer and musicologist
Gene Damschroder (1922–2008), American politician
Rex Damschroder (born 1950), American politician

See also
Damschroder Rock, a rock formation of Queen Elizabeth Land, Antarctica